Richard Cavendish, 2nd Baron Waterpark FSA (13 July 1765 – 1 June 1830), was an Anglo-Irish politician and peer.

Early life
Waterpark was the son of Sir Henry Cavendish, 2nd Baronet and Sarah Cavendish, 1st Baroness Waterpark.

Waterpark succeeded to his father's baronetcy in 1804 and his mother's barony in 1807, at which point the two titles merged.

Career
He sat in the Irish House of Commons as the Member of Parliament for Portarlington between 1790 and 1797. He was a fellow of the Society of Antiquaries of London.

Personal life
On 6 August 1789, he was married to Juliana Cooper, the daughter of Thomas Cooper. Together they had nine children.

He was succeeded by his eldest son, Henry Cavendish.

References 

1765 births
1830 deaths
Barons in the Peerage of Ireland
Richard
18th-century Anglo-Irish people
Irish MPs 1790–1797
Members of the Parliament of Ireland (pre-1801) for Portarlington